Marian Heiss Price (born August 6, 1938) is a former Nebraska state senator from Lincoln, Nebraska and registered nurse. She is a Republican. 

Personal life

Price was born August 6, 1938, in Page, Nebraska, and graduated from Page High School in 1955. She attended Nebraska Wesleyan University from 1955 to 1956.  During this time she became a member of Alpha Gamma Delta. Price graduated from Bryan Memorial Hospital school of nursing in 1959. She is a former member of the Lincoln Board of Education and the Lancaster County reorganization committee. She is a member of Bethany Christian Church, Bryan Memorial Hospital School of Nursing alumnae association, and board of directors of the Home Health Services for Independent Living Inc., as well as other organizations.

State legislature

Price was elected in 1998 to represent the 26th Nebraska legislative district and reelected in 2002. She sat on the Appropriations and Nebraska Retirement Systems committees as well as the Committee on Committees and is the vice chairperson of the Legislative Performance Audit. Since Nebraska voters passed Initiative Measure 415 in 2001 limiting state senators to two terms after 2001, she was unable run for reelection.

References

1938 births
Living people
Republican Party Nebraska state senators
Politicians from Lincoln, Nebraska
Women state legislators in Nebraska
People from Holt County, Nebraska
Nebraska Wesleyan University alumni
21st-century American women